Tabassum Fatima Hashmi (born 4 November 1971), credited as Tabu, is an Indian actress who works primarily in Hindi films, alongside Telugu, Tamil and English films. Regarded as one of the most accomplished actresses in Hindi cinema, she has often played troubled women, from fictional to literary, in both mainstream and independent cinema. She is the recipient of numerous accolades, including two National Film Awards, six Filmfare Awards (including a record four Best Actress (Critics)), and two Filmfare Awards South. In 2011, she was awarded the Padma Shri, the fourth highest Indian civilian honour.

Tabu had her first credited role as a teenager in Dev Anand's Hum Naujawan (1985) and played her first leading role in the Telugu film Coolie No. 1 (1991). In 1994, she received the Filmfare Award for Best Female Debut for the Hindi action drama Vijaypath. She won the National Film Award for Best Actress for playing a young woman affected by the Punjab insurgency in Maachis (1996). Also in 1996, she had commercial successes in Ninne Pelladata, Saajan Chale Sasural and Jeet. Further box office hits came with Border (1997), Biwi No.1 (1999), Hum Saath-Saath Hain (1999), Kandukondain Kandukondain (2000) and Hera Pheri (2000). 

Tabu gained acclaim for portraying troubled women in Virasat (1997), Hu Tu Tu (1999), and Astitva (2000), all of which won her Filmfare Critics Awards; and Chandni Bar (2001) which earned her a second National Film Award. This acclaim continued with the films Maqbool (2004), Cheeni Kum (2007), which won her a record fourth Filmfare Critics Award, and Haider (2014), which earned her the Filmfare Award for Best Supporting Actress. Tabu expanded to American cinema with The Namesake (2006) and Life of Pi (2012). Her biggest commercial successes in India came with Drishyam (2015), Golmaal Again (2017), Andhadhun (2018), De De Pyaar De (2019), Ala Vaikunthapurramuloo (2020), Bhool Bhulaiyaa 2 (2022) and Drishyam 2 (2022).

Early life and family 
Tabassum Fatima Hashmi was born on 4 November 1971 to Jamal Ali Hashmi and Rizwana in a Hyderabadi Muslim family. Her parents divorced when she was three. Her mother was a school-teacher and her maternal grandparents were retired professors who ran a school. Her grandfather, Mohammed Ahsan, was a professor of mathematics, and her grandmother was a professor of English Literature. 

Tabu did her schooling at St. Ann's High School, Vijayanagar Colony, Hyderabad. She moved to Mumbai in 1983 and studied at St. Xavier's College for 2 years. She is the niece of Shabana Azmi, Tanvi Azmi and Baba Azmi and the younger sister of actress Farah Naaz. She is reluctant to discuss her personal life in the media.

Career

Debut and critical acclaim (1982–1999) 
As a child, Tabu had an uncredited appearance in Bazaar (1982), and later in Hum Naujawan (1985) at the age of 14; she played Dev Anand's daughter in the film. Her first role as an actress was in the Telugu film Coolie No.1 (1991) co-starring with Venkatesh. In December 1987, producer Boney Kapoor launched 2 major films; Roop Ki Rani Choron Ka Raja and Prem. In Prem, Tabu was signed opposite Sanjay Kapoor, Boney's younger brother. The film took 8 years in the making and it turned out to be the biggest flop in Boney Kapoor's production career.

Tabu's first release in Hindi as a leading lady was Pehla Pehla Pyar (1994), which went unnoticed. She rose to prominence with her role in Vijaypath (1994) opposite Ajay Devgan, for which she received Best Female Debut at Filmfare. This was followed by several unsuccessful films; however, in this period she appeared in a box-office success Haqeeqat (1995).

In 1996, Tabu had 8 releases. 2 films Saajan Chale Sasural and Jeet were successful at the box office, ranking in the top 5 films of that year. Her other significant film, Maachis, was critically acclaimed. Her role as a Punjabi woman caught in the rise of Sikh insurgency was highly acclaimed; she went on to win her first National Film Award for Best Actress for her performance. The same year saw her major blockbuster films down south. She starred in the Telugu blockbuster Ninne Pelladata, opposite Nagarjuna, a film which won the National Film Award for Best Feature Film in Telugu. Anupama Chopra wrote that she was "breathtakingly sensuous" in the part. The critically acclaimed Malayalam period epic film Kalapani directed by Priyadarshan brought her laurels for her acting from all across South India. She also debuted in Kollywood through the highly successful Tamil film Kadhal Desam, directed by Kathir.

Tabu's first release of 1997 was Border a war drama about the real-life events surrounding the Battle of Longewala during the Indo-Pak War of 1971. She played the role of Sunny Deol's wife. Her role was small, but the film went on to be the second-biggest hit of 1997 after Dil To Pagal Hai. That year, she also starred in the critically acclaimed film Virasat. The film was a success at the box office and Tabu won the Filmfare Best Actress (Critics) for her performance in the film. The same year saw her feature in Mani Ratnam's Tamil political drama Iruvar which had an ensemble cast including Mohanlal, Aishwarya Rai, Prakash Raj and Gautami. She also appeared in Chachi 420 (1998).

In 1999, she starred in 2 successful multi-starrers; Biwi No.1 and Hum Saath-Saath Hain: We Stand United, which went to become the highest-grossing and the second highest-grossing films of the year respectively. She received positive reviews for Hu Tu Tu, which won her another Filmfare Best Actress (Critics).

Stardom and expansion (2000-2009) 
In 2000, Tabu starred in Hera Pheri and Astitva. The former was a box-office success whilst the latter was critically acclaimed. Hindustan Times critic Arnab Banerjee wrote of her performance: "Tabu is brilliant and once again proves her mettle as an actress. The mind-blowing range of emotions she displays, her exquisite face and her subtle quiet dignity with which she handles her character, will take her far in her film career." She received her third Filmfare Best Actress (Critics) for Astitva. Down south, Tabu had 2 releases in Tamil, namely Kandukondain Kandukondain, a multi-starrer blockbuster film directed by Rajeev Menon and she stard with Mammootty, Ajith Kumar and Aishwarya Rai; and Snegithiye directed by Priyadarshan, along with a Malayalam release Cover Story opposite Suresh Gopi. The original Malayalam version of Snegithiye, titled Raakilipattu released in 2007.

2001 saw her star in Chandni Bar directed by Madhur Bhandarkar. Her portrayal of a bar dancer met with unanimous acclaim from critics, and she won her second National Film Award for Best Actress for her performance. Critic Taran Adarsh said: "Chandni Bar is Tabu's film all the way and there are no two opinions on that. Her performance deserves the highest marks and of course, all the awards. Her work is flawless and the impact her character makes on the minds of the viewer is also due to a tailor-made role". Another critic mentioned: "if there is one actress who can carry a film on her shoulders, it is Tabu. As usual, she sparkles!"

She has acted in a number of Telugu movies, many of them very successful, such as Coolie No. 1 (1991) and Ninne Pelladutha (1996), the latter being one of her most famous and popular movies. She further continued to star in films such as Aavida Maa Aavide (1998) with Nagarjuna, Chennakeshava Reddy (2002) and Pandurangadu (2008) with Nandamuri Balakrishna and Andarivaadu (2005) with Chiranjeevi. Tabu made a comeback into Telugu films after a long hiatus with the film Pandurangudu in 2008. Her roles in Telugu movies are largely eye-candy and glamorous.

In 2003, Tabu starred in an adaptation of William Shakespeare's Macbeth. The actress played Nimmi based on the character Lady Macbeth. The film, titled Maqbool, was directed by Vishal Bhardwaj and premiered at the 2003 Toronto International Film Festival. Maqbool was a box-office failure, but was met with high acclaim. Tabu's performance opened to high critical acclaim; critic Ron Ahluwalia said: "Tabu shines in a dark role. The most versatile actress in Bollywood takes to villainy like a second nature. She is menacing and seductive, but keeps an innocent look on her face, making her even viler. The way Tabu delivers her taunts is simply perfect. Her gradual insanity is heart-wrenching and her final outburst is easily the highlight of the film." Another critic said: "Tabu is fantastic in a complex role. Her performance in the film is worthy of awards. After Chandni Bar, this is another role that will be remembered for a long, long time."

She had a supporting role in Fanaa (2006), alongside Aamir Khan and Kajol. The film went on to become the sixth highest-grossing film of the year. The same year, she starred in her first Hollywood film The Namesake, directed by Mira Nair. The film was a big hit overseas.

In 2007, she starred in Cheeni Kum, in which she played a 34-year-old woman who falls in love with a 64-year-old chef played by Amitabh Bachchan. The film received positive reviews from critics; Taran Adarsh said: "Tabu stands on her feet despite a formidable co-star's domineering presence. She's excellent." Though the film was moderately successful in the domestic market but it performed well overseas, especially in UK and US.

Further career and commercial success (2010–2019) 
In 2010, Tabu portrayed the lead role in the romantic comedy film Toh Baat Pakki!, which earned huge publicity as it marked Tabu's return to Bollywood after 3 years. However, the film was a commercial failure. Her next release of the year was Khuda Kasam opposite Sunny Deol, a film long-delayed. Her other film Banda Yeh Bindaas Hai, directed by B. R. Chopra, got indefinitely shelved owing to the plagiarism issues. She made a comeback to Malayalam cinema in 2011 with her brief song appearance in the multi starrer film Urumi, directed by Santosh Sivan. The song "Aaranne Aaranne" featuring Tabu alongside Prabhu Deva and Prithviraj Sukumaran was declared a chartbuster of the year.

In 2012, she featured in her second Hollywood film Life of Pi, directed by Ang Lee. She played a supporting role as the mother of the protagonist. Her next and only release in 2013 was David, co-starring Vikram in the lead and directed by Bejoy Nambiar. The year 2014 saw her comeback to mainstream commercial cinema with the Salman Khan-starrer Jai Ho, a remake of the Telugu film Stalin, playing the elder sister role to Khan. The film evoked mixed responses and was successful at the box office. Following this, she teamed up with her Maqbool director Vishal Bhardwaj for his adaptation film of Shakespeare's Hamlet, titled Haider. In the adaptation, she played the role of Ghazala Meer (Gertrude) to Shahid Kapoor's Haider (Hamlet). Haider was a major critical and commercial success, and Tabu's performance received widespread critical acclaim with The New York Times saying that the film should have been titled Ghazala, rather than Haider. Her next venture saw her teaming up with actor Ajay Devgan after a gap of 16 years. She paired opposite him in Nishikant Kamat's murder-mystery film Drishyam (2015), which was a remake of the acclaimed Malayalam film with the same name. Her performance as a strict police officer investigating her son's murder case received highly positive reviews. This was followed by a cameo appearance in Meghna Gulzar's directorial Talvar. She then starred in Abhishek Kapoor's Fitoor (2016), an adaptation of Charles Dickens' Great Expectations, opposite Aditya Roy Kapoor and Katrina Kaif, in which she essayed the role of Begum Hazrat, based on the character of Miss Havisham. Although the film did not do well at the box office, she received high critical acclaim for her performance.

Breaking from her mould of serious cinema, in 2017, Tabu starred in the fourth edition of Rohit Shetty's Golmaal (film series) titled Golmaal Again. She played the role of a ghostbuster and drew critical praise for her performance, with The Indian Express saying that her inclusion to the film is an "unexpected pleasure" and she "lifts" the film. Golmaal Again became one of the highest-grossing films of the year.

Her first release in 2018 was Mukul Abhyankar's thriller film Missing where she paired opposite Manoj Bajpai. Though her portrayal of a petrified mother was praised, the film underperformed at the box office.

In 2018, she featured in a cameo role as herself in Rajkumar Hirani's biopic Sanju starring Ranbir Kapoor. She hit the peak of her popularity through Sriram Raghavan's black comedy crime thriller Andhadhun (2018) which saw her as the parallel lead Simi Sinha, alongside Ayushmann Khurrana's Akash Saraf, and drew high critical acclaim from critics. The Hindustan Times lauded Tabu asking, "Has there ever been a femme as fatal as Tabu?" Film critic Rajeev Masand praised Tabu's portrayal mentioning that, "the film's towering performance comes from Tabu." Firstpost called Tabu, "tremendously gifted, whose chameleon-esque talent is put to great use here." It further remarked, "The manner in which Tabu (Simi) switches from one emotion to the next to the next, at one point her face and voice conveying completely different feelings, is a sight to behold." Actor Vicky Kaushal praised Tabu calling her " a goddess who is in a league of her own". Actress Kangana Ranaut said in a press interview, "I think last year, Tabu-ji gave an amazing performance in Andhadhun. I am floored by what she has done."

In 2019, she appeared in Akiv Ali's romantic comedy De De Pyaar De opposite Ajay Devgn and Ali Abbas Zafar's drama Bharat co-starring Salman Khan and Katrina Kaif.

Recent work (2020–present) 
In 2020, she made a comeback in Telugu films after a decade by starring in Ala Vaikunthapurramuloo, a project of Trivikram Srinivas and Allu Arjun. She has also starred in a family entertainer titled Jawaani Jaaneman (2020) co-starring Saif Ali Khan with whom she shared screen space after 2 decades. Critics said she "shines" in the small role.

In 2022, she received critical acclaim for portraying a double role in Bhool Bhulaiyaa 2, a horror comedy by Anees Bazmee, which garnered the highest box office opening amongst Hindi films of 2022. Critics said that Tabu "stole the show". Later that year, she starred in the sequel to Drishyam, Drishyam 2, directed by Abhishek Pathak. It became a huge critical and commercial success, along with becoming her highest-grossing film of her career.

In 2023, Tabu first portrayed a police officer in Kuttey.

Tabu will next appear in Bholaa and Auron Mein Kahan Dum Tha alongside Ajay Devgan. She will also appear in Khufiya. Tabu also has The Crew, co-starring Kareena Kapoor and Kriti Sanon in her kitty.

Artistry and media image

Tabu is among the most accomplished actresses in Hindi cinema, known for her work in both mainstream and independent cinema. India Today noted that her "uncontrived freshness" and "mobile face" has become a Bollywood favourite, while her performances speak of "a considerable range". Filmfare noted, "When you find her name on the credit list of a movie, expectations automatically shoot up." Forbes noted that Tabu portrayed "strong women-oriented characters" much before such roles started being called "game-changers". Vogue noted that Tabu has delivered "non-stop stellar and heart-swooning performances." Eastern Eye termed her a "versatile performer" and said, "Tabu is regularly called upon to add weight to commercial blockbusters."

Tabu is known to be selective about her film roles and has once said, "I do films which move me and most of all, the unit and the director should appeal to me." In 2019, at the 17th Indian Film Festival of Los Angeles she was honored with "Opening Night Tribute". In 2019, Film Companion ranked Tabu's performance in Haider and Andhadhun among the 100 Greatest Performances of the Decade. 

India Today named her in their "Top Bollywood Actresses" list. She was placed in Filmfares "Top Ten Actresses" of 2003. In Rediff.coms "Top Ten Actresses" list, she ranked 9th in 2007. She topped the list in 2014 and 2018. In 1998, Tabu received the Smita Patil Memorial Award for Best Actress, for her contribution to Indian cinema. Forbes India included Tabu in its "50 Showstoppers" list of 2022.

Controversy
In 1998, Tabu was charged with poaching two blackbucks on the outskirts of Kankani village in Jodhpur district of Rajasthan during the filming of Hum Saath Saath Hain along with co-stars Salman Khan, Saif Ali Khan, Sonali Bendre and Neelam Kothari. A lower court charged her with the others under the Wildlife Protection Act, 1972 and the IPC. She had filed a revision petition before a sessions court which discharged her of Section 51 (causing harm to wildlife) of Wildlife Act and both of 147 (punishment for rioting) and 149 (unlawful assembly of persons) of the Indian Penal Code. The Rajasthan State Government then filed a revision petition before the Rajasthan High Court at Jodhpur which again added Section 149 against her, which had been dropped earlier. In December 2012, the Jodhpur court summoned her along with all the accused for commencement of the trial with the revised charges on 4 February 2013. Although Tabu was acquitted in the blackbuck poaching case on 5 April 2018, the Rajasthan High Court issued her with a notice, challenging her acquittal on 11 March 2019.

Awards and nominations 

Tabu received National Film Award for Best Actress for Maachis and Chandni Bar. She received Filmfare Critics Award for Best Actress for Virasat, Hu Tu Tu, Astitva and Cheeni Kum, along with Filmfare Award for Best Supporting Actress for Haider. She was awarded the Padma Shri, India's fourth highest civilian award, by the Government of India for her contributions towards the arts in 2011.

See also 
 List of Indian film actresses

References

External links 

 
 
 

1971 births
Living people
Indian film actresses
Actresses in Hindi cinema
Actresses in Telugu cinema
Actresses in Tamil cinema
Actresses in Malayalam cinema
Actresses in Bengali cinema
Actresses in Marathi cinema
Actresses from Hyderabad, India
Best Actress National Film Award winners
Recipients of the Padma Shri in arts
Filmfare Awards winners
Filmfare Awards South winners
20th-century Indian actresses
21st-century Indian actresses
Female models from Hyderabad, India
South Indian International Movie Awards winners
Screen Awards winners
International Indian Film Academy Awards winners
Zee Cine Awards winners